The Trans-Caucasian fox (Vulpes vulpes kurdistanica) is a subspecies of the red fox, found in the Armenian Highlands but also parts of Asia Minor and Iran.

Name 

This species is known as Vulpes vulpes kurdistanica and sometimes Kurdistan red fox. The Turkish government removed the word Kurdistan from the name and recognized the subspecies as Vulpes vulpes for nationalistic reasons.

Range
Despite its name, the species is not confined to Kurdish-inhabited areas but appeared near Ankara, Elazığ, and also Sulaymaniyah. This small, doglike animal is rusty-red with white underparts, chin and throat. The ears are prominent and the tail is long and bushy with a white tip. Backs of the ears, lower legs and the feet are black. The fox goes through colour phases of black, silver, and mixed.

Description
This small, doglike animal is rusty-red with white underparts, chin and throat. The ears are prominent and the tail is long and bushy with a white tip. Backs of the ears, lower legs and the feet are black. The fox goes through color phases of black, silver, and mixed. This fox subspecies ranges  in length without its tail. Tail ranges . Life Expectancy seven years (in the wild) 15 years (in captivity)

References

External links

Mammals described in 1906
Vulpes
Mammals of Asia
Mammals of the Middle East